Nick Paterson (born 24 September 1979) is an Australian former professional rugby league footballer who played for North Queensland, Cronulla and Manly-Warringah in the NRL.

Playing career

A prop from Toowoomba, Paterson started his NRL career at North Queensland, where he played a total of 15 first-grade games in three seasons. Most of his appearances came in the 2001 NRL season, featuring in 12 rounds. From 2002 to 2003, Paterson played under Chris Anderson at Cronulla, then switched to Manly-Warringah in 2004, but was unable to get regular games at either club.

Since leaving the NRL, Paterson played locally in Queensland before retiring in 2008 to pursue a coaching career. Paterson, a Queensland Police officer outside of football, coached the Caloundra Sharks to an A-Grade premiership in 2009 and has been as assistant coach with Sunshine Coast.

References

External links
Nick Paterson at Rugby League project

1979 births
Living people
Australian police officers
Australian rugby league coaches
Australian rugby league players
Cronulla-Sutherland Sharks players
Manly Warringah Sea Eagles players
North Queensland Cowboys players
Rugby league players from Toowoomba
Rugby league props
Sunshine Coast Falcons players